Resanovci is a village in the municipality of Bosansko Grahovo, Bosnia and Herzegovina.

Demographics 
According to the 2013 census, its population was 102.

References

Populated places in Bosansko Grahovo
Serb communities in the Federation of Bosnia and Herzegovina